The Ingenium family is a range of modular engines produced by Jaguar Land Rover, in both petrol and diesel variants. It uses a modular architecture making it possible to be produced in three-, four- and six-cylinder versions (built around individual 500 cc cylinders), depending on demand and requirements. The engines sourced from Ford were replaced by engines from Jaguar Land Rover's new Ingenium engine line from late 2015.

Ingenium's design is configurable and flexible for longitudinal and transverse architectures and for front, rear, and all-wheel drive, together with auto and manual transmissions. Hybrid variants are set to be released in the future. Both single- and twin-turbo boosting solutions from Mitsubishi and BorgWarner are used. Particular emphasis has been placed on achieving exceptionally low internal friction, which is described as being 17% less than a current 2.2-L diesel. "Other details include roller bearings on cam and balancer shafts instead of machined-in bearing surfaces, computer-controlled variable oil and water pumps, a split circuit cooling system enabling fast warm ups, a simplified cam drive system, crankshafts that are offset from the centre of the block and electronically controlled piston cooling jets to improve efficiency in the oil pumping circuit."

In 2017 Jaguar Land Rover licensed the Multiair/UniAir electrohydraulic variable valve lift system from Schaeffler Group, which Schaeffler in turn licensed from Fiat Chrysler Automobiles in 2001. The system, developed by Fiat Powertrain Technologies, is an hydraulically-actuated variable valve timing (VVT) technology enabling "cylinder by cylinder, stroke by stroke" control of intake air directly via a gasoline engine's inlet valves.

In February 2019, Jaguar Land Rover announced their long-rumoured inline-6 engine. Instead of being a conventional engine, the new 3.0L petrol inline-6 motor combines with a 48 volt electric architecture to enable an electric supercharger, belt-starter generator and extended engine shut offs while coasting and/or while stopped in traffic. Both are considered to be mild hybrid electric vehicles. The 48 volt electrical architecture JLR announced with this new engine is  similar to Mercedes-Benz's "EQ Boost" and Audi's 48V systems available in 2019.

Engine family list

See also 
MultiAir
Jaguar AJ-V8 
Land Rover Engines

References

External links 
 http://media.jaguar.com/news/2016/09/jaguar-land-rover-expands-ingenium-powertrain-family
 http://media.jaguar.com/news/2014/09/ingenium-world-class-engine-technologies-powering-new-jaguar-xe
 http://www.evo.co.uk/news/evonews/292819/jlr_launches_ingenium_engine_family.html
 https://blog.caranddriver.com/jaguar-land-rover-details-new-scalable-turbocharged-ingenium-engine-family/

Jaguar Land Rover engines
Straight-three engines
Straight-four engines
Straight-six engines